Manganese was a  coaster that was built in 1925 by Norderwerft AG, Hamburg, Germany as Wiedau for German owners. She was seized by the Allies in May 1945, passed to the Ministry of War Transport (MoWT) and was renamed Empire Contract. Later that year, she was transferred to Greece and renamed Herakleion. She was sold into merchant service in 1948 and renamed Laconia. In 1965, she was sold to Egypt and renamed  Manganese. The ship was deleted from Lloyd's Register in 1993.

Description
The ship was built in 1925 by Norderwerft AG, Hamburg, as yard number 605. She was completed in May 1925.

The engine was built by Dresdner Maschinenbau & Schiffs Uegibau AG, Dresden.

History
Wiedau was built for the Bugsier Line, Hamburg. The Code Letters RFLK were allocated. In 1934, her code letters were changed to DHZV.

In May 1945, Wiedau was seized by the Allies at Hamburg. She was passed to the MoWT and renamed Empire Contract. Her port of registry was changed to London. The Code Letters GJDY and United Kingdom Official Number 180593 were allocated. She was placed under the management of G Gibson & Son Ltd. Later that year, she was transferred to the Greek Government and was renamed Herakleion.

In 1948, Herakleion was sold to the Lakoniki Steamship Navigation Co and was renamed Laconia. She was operated under the management of I Tsengas & Co, serving until 1954 when she was sold to the Hellenic Levant Line. In 1964, Laconia was sold to J Alexatos. In 1965, she was sold to the Sinai Manganese Co, Egypt and was renamed Manganese. The ship was deleted from Lloyd's Register in 1993.

References

1925 ships
Ships built in Hamburg
Steamships of Germany
Merchant ships of Germany
World War II merchant ships of Germany
Ministry of War Transport ships
Empire ships
Steamships of the United Kingdom
Steamships of Greece
Merchant ships of Greece
Steamships of Egypt
Merchant ships of Egypt